Mevinphos is an organophosphate insecticide that acts as an acetylcholinesterase inhibitor to control insects in a wide range of crops.  It is most commonly used for the control of chewing and sucking insects, as well as spider mites. Common synonym names are duraphos, fosdrin, menite, mevinfos, mevinox, phosdrin, and phosdrine. It is not allowed in the EU anymore.

Manufacture
Mevinphos is produced by the reaction of trimethyl phosphite with chloroacetoacetate.

References

Further reading

External links 
 

Acetylcholinesterase inhibitors
Insecticides
Organophosphate insecticides
Carboxylate esters
Phosphate esters
Alkene derivatives
Acetoacetate esters